Peter "Spud" Rowsell (born 1944-2021) was a yachtsman and boatbuilder based in Exmouth, Devon, England.  Amongst many racing successes, Rowsell won the Merlin Rocket Class Championships at Abersoch Wales in 1978, crewed by Jon Turner, with a series of results which have not been surpassed by any later Champion of the Class. Rowsell was in partnership with Phil Morrison as Rowsell Morrison for about 15 years.

References

English male sailors (sport)
British boat builders
Living people
People from Exmouth
1944 births